CGS Acadia was a fisheries patrol vessel of the Canadian Department of Marine and Fisheries from 1885 to 1909. The ship began life as the yacht Yosemite, constructed in the United States in 1880. After being acquired in 1885 by Canada and renamed Acadia, the ship served in the Atlantic fisheries, enforcing fisheries regulations in Canadian waters. The ship was taken out of service in 1909 and sold for scrap and Acadias registry was closed in 1910.

Description

Service history
The ship was ordered by William Belden from J. Roach & Sons and was constructed at their Delaware River Iron Ship and Engine Works shipyard in Chester, Pennsylvania. The vessel was launched on 9 August 1880 and completed in December of that year. On 14 July 1882, while sailing up the Hudson River, Yosemite was involved in a collision with the yacht Vanderbilt off of Esopus Meadow lighthouse, sinking the vessel. The owner of Vanderbilt brought the affair to court, reaching the United States Supreme Court in 1893, where Belden was found guilty of negligence in operating Yosemite and forced to pay Vanderbilts owner damages.

In 1885, the vessel was acquired by the Canadian government and converted to a fisheries patrol vessel. Originally keeping the name Yosemite, the ship was renamed Acadia in 1891. The ship was used to patrol the fisheries along the East Coast of Canada. The crew were armed with swords and carried small arms for use during ship boardings. Acadia remained in service until 1909, when the ship was sold for scrap. Acadias registry was closed in 1910.

See also

  – served alongside Acadia in the Maritimes on non-naval patrols.

Notes

Citations

Sources

 
 

1880 ships
Canadian Government Ship
Ships built by the Delaware River Iron Ship Building and Engine Works
Steamships